Darya Popova (born 29 September 2001) is a Ukrainian ice dancer. With her former skating partner, Volodymyr Byelikov, she is the 2017 Volvo Open Cup silver medalist and 2019 Ukrainian national champion on the senior level. The team has finished within the top twelve at two World Junior Championships (2017, 2018).

Career

Early years 
Popova began learning to skate in 2005. Early in her career, she skated with Vadym Kravtsov and Volodymyr Nakisko. During the 2015–2016 season, Popova/Nakisko competed at two ISU Junior Grand Prix (JGP) events and won the bronze medal at the Ukrainian Junior Championships. They were coached by Halyna Churylova and Mariana Kozlova in Kharkiv.

2016–2017 season 
Popova and Volodymyr Byelikov teamed up in 2016, coached by Halyna Churylova and Mariana Kozlova in Kharkiv. They made their international debut at the ISU Junior Grand Prix in the Czech Republic in early September 2016. They placed 8th in Ostrava and 7th at their next JGP assignment, in Tallinn, Estonia. The duo took silver at the senior-level Ukrainian Championship before winning gold at the junior event.

Popova/Byelikov were selected to represent Ukraine at the 2017 World Junior Championships in Taipei, Taiwan; they placed 11th in the short dance, 12th in the free dance, and 12th overall.

2017–2018 season 
During the 2017 JGP series, Popova/Byelikov placed 6th competing in September in Minsk, Belarus, and 5th in early October in Gdańsk, Poland. Their senior international debut came in November at the Volvo Open Cup in Riga, Latvia. They won silver at the event, finishing second to Germany's Katharina Müller / Tim Dieck and ahead of Hungary's Anna Yanovskaya / Ádám Lukács.

Continuing on the senior level, Popova/Byelikov placed 9th at the 2017 CS Tallinn Trophy, 8th at the Santa Claus Cup, and second at the Ukrainian Championships. They were included in Ukraine's team to the 2018 European Championships, held in January in Moscow, but did not reach the free dance, placing 22nd in the short. In March, they competed at the 2018 World Junior Championships in Sofia (Bulgaria), ranking 9th in the short, 11th in the free, and 11th overall.

2018–2019 season 
Popova/Byelikov won bronze at their first 2018 Junior Grand Prix event in Lithuania, and then placed fourth in Slovenia.  Following that, they competed at the 2018 CS Tallinn Trophy, placing fifth, and won their first Ukrainian national title.  After a sixteenth-place finish at the 2019 European Championships, they competed at the 2019 World Junior Championships, placing eleventh.

2019–2020 season 
Competing in two Challenger events, Popova/Byelikov placed twelfth at the 2019 CS Nebelhorn Trophy and tenth at the 2019 CS Golden Spin of Zagreb.  They won the silver medal at the Ukrainian championships, and competed at a number of minor internationals.

2020–2021 season 
Beginning the season at the 2020 CS Nebelhorn Trophy, which due to the COVID-19 pandemic was attended only by European skaters.  They won the bronze medal.

Programs

With Byelikov

With Nakisko

Competitive highlights 
CS: Challenger Series; JGP: Junior Grand Prix

With Byelikov

With Nakisko

References

External links 

 

2001 births
Ukrainian female ice dancers
Living people
Sportspeople from Kharkiv
21st-century Ukrainian women